Aytré is a commune in the Charente-Maritime department, Nouvelle-Aquitaine, southwestern France.

Aytré is especially known for its long beach, which is easily accessible from neighbouring La Rochelle, or Les Minimes. The beach is flat and shallow, making it a good bathing spot for children, and an excellent spot for windsurfing.

The historian Jean Prasteau (1921–1997) was born in Aytré, as was Jean Desaguliers, a Protestant pastor, and father of John Theophilus Desaguliers.

Economy 
Industries are few, and economic activity mainly gravitates around La Rochelle, with the distinct exception of Alstom Transportation.  The world's fastest train, TGV, was designed right in Aytré. Oysters are cultivated in the bay and important camping grounds have been developed for tourists during the summer period.

History 
During the Siege of La Rochelle, Cardinal de Richelieu spent time in a farm just to the south of Aytré.

Population

See also
Communes of the Charente-Maritime department

References

External links

 Official website

Communes of Charente-Maritime